ISO 14641-1, Electronic archiving—Part 1: Specifications concerning the design and the operation of an information system for electronic information preservation, was the first ISO 14641 standard prepared by ISO Technical Committee 171 (ISO/TC 171) Document management applications, Subcommittee SC 3, General issues. The document was submitted as a French National Standard and was adopted as NF Z42-013:2009 in France.

This part of ISO 14641 describes the methods and techniques to be used in an electronic information system for managing documents within an archive.

See also
 ISO 14641 – standard for Electronic archiving

Related links

14641-1
Digital preservation